Ivan Stepanovich Ganetsky (October 8, 1810 – 1887) was an Imperial Russian division commander. He fought in wars in the Caucasus, Poland and against the Ottoman Empire.

Awards
Order of Saint George, 3rd degree, 1877
Order of Saint George, 4th degree, 1852
Order of Saint Vladimir, 1st class, 1883
Order of Saint Vladimir, 2nd class, 1853
Order of Saint Vladimir, 3rd class, 1853
Order of Saint Alexander Nevsky, 1871
Order of Saint Alexander Nevsky with diamonds, 1874
Order of the White Eagle (Russian Empire), 1864
Order of Saint Anna, 1st class, 1858
Order of Saint Anna, 1st class with crown, 1860
Order of Saint Anna, 2nd class, 1846
Order of Saint Anna, 2nd class with crown, 1849
Order of Saint Anna, 3rd class, 1837
Order of Saint Stanislaus (House of Romanov), 1st class, 1856
Order of Saint Stanislaus (House of Romanov), 2nd class, 1844

Sources
 
 Ганецкий, Иван Степанович // Военная энциклопедия : [в 18 т.] / под ред. В. Ф. Новицкого ... [и других: К. И. Величко, А. В. фон-Шварца, В. А. Апушкина, Г. К. фон-Шульца]. — Санкт-Петербург ; [Москва] : Типография т-ва И. Д. Сытина, 1911–1915.
 Милорадович Г. А. Список лиц свиты их величеств с царствования императора Петра I по 1886 г. СПб., 1886.
 Ганецкий, Иван Степанович // Русский биографический словарь : в 25 томах. — Санкт-Петербург—Москва, 1896–1918.
 Список генералам по старшинству на 1886 год. СПб., 1886.

External links
Личные воспоминания поручика Ипполита Михайловича Рогге, ординарца генерала Ганецкого, о последнем сражении за Плевну.

1810 births
1887 deaths
People of the Caucasian War
Russian people of the January Uprising
Russian military personnel of the Russo-Turkish War (1877–1878)
Recipients of the Order of St. George of the Third Degree
Recipients of the Order of St. Vladimir, 1st class
Recipients of the Order of St. Vladimir, 2nd class
Recipients of the Order of St. Vladimir, 3rd class
Recipients of the Order of the White Eagle (Russia)
Recipients of the Order of St. Anna, 1st class
Recipients of the Order of St. Anna, 2nd class
Recipients of the Order of St. Anna, 3rd class
Recipients of the Order of Saint Stanislaus (Russian), 1st class
Recipients of the Order of Saint Stanislaus (Russian), 2nd class